Old Bank Buildings is row of shops and offices in Foregate Street in Chester.

History
The buildings were designed by T. M. Lockwood and completed in 1895. They are built in brick with applied timber-framing and a tiled roof. The buildings are in three storeys with cellars, and have modern shop fronts in the ground floor. The first floor projects over the pavement and is carried on posts. The top floor and the two gables are jettied with decorative corbels. There is one casement window, the other windows being oriels. On the corner is a timber-framed turret with a cupola. The buildings were initially used by Lloyds Bank and by Williams Deacon's Bank.

The buildings became the headquarters of the Cheshire Yeomanry just before the First World War. The regiment was mobilised at the buildings in August 1914 before being deployed to Egypt and after the war the buildings were decommissioned and returned to commercial use.

See also

Grade II listed buildings in Chester (east)

References

Sources

Buildings and structures in Chester
Grade II listed buildings in Chester